DXNU (107.5 FM), broadcasting as 107.5 Win Radio, is a radio station owned by Mabuhay Broadcasting System and operated by ZimZam Management, Inc. The station's studio and transmitter are located along Broadcast Ave., Shrine Hills, Brgy. Matina Crossing, Davao City.

History

The station began operations on February 1, 1992, as NU 107 with a modern rock format. It was formerly under the ownership of Progressive Broadcasting Corporation. In 2010, it became a relay station of DWNU in Manila. On September 1, 2012, it began airing its own local programming under the Win Radio network.

In 2016, after House Bill No. 5982 was passed into law, Mabuhay Broadcasting System acquired the provincial stations of PBC.

References

External links
Win Radio Davao

Progressive Broadcasting Corporation
Radio stations established in 1992
Radio stations in Davao City